Shuja Haider (born 31 May 1994) is a Pakistani cricketer who plays for Lahore. He made his first-class debut on 26 October 2015 in the 2015–16 Quaid-e-Azam Trophy.

References

External links
 

1994 births
Living people
Pakistani cricketers
Lahore cricketers
Cricketers from Lahore